Xanthonia is a genus of leaf beetles in the subfamily Eumolpinae. It is distributed in North and Central America, and in East, Southeast and South Asia.

Species
Species include:

Xanthonia angulata Staines & Weisman, 2001
Xanthonia collaris Chen, 1940
Xanthonia coomani (Pic, 1936)
Xanthonia decemnotata (Say, 1824)
Xanthonia dentata Staines & Weisman, 2002
Xanthonia dorsalis Chûjô, 1966
Xanthonia flavescens Tan, 1988
Xanthonia flavoannulata Blake, 1954
Xanthonia foveata Tan, 1992
Xanthonia fulva Takizawa, 1987
Xanthonia furcata Staines & Weisman, 2001
Xanthonia glabra Medvedev, 2002
Xanthonia glabrata Tan, 1992
Xanthonia guatemalensis Jacoby, 1882
Xanthonia hirsuta Weisman, 2019
Xanthonia insularis Medvedev & Takizawa, 2011
Xanthonia intermedia Staines & Weisman, 2001
Xanthonia jacobyi Clavareau, 1914
Xanthonia lateralis (Jacoby, 1882)
Xanthonia lineigera (Weise, 1922)
Xanthonia marmorata Jacoby, 1882
Xanthonia marquai Riley & Quinn, 2019
Xanthonia minuta (Pic, 1929)
Xanthonia monticola Staines & Weisman, 2001
Xanthonia morimotoi Kimoto & Gressitt, 1982
Xanthonia nepalensis Takizawa, 1987
Xanthonia nigrofasciata Jacoby, 1882
Xanthonia nitida Weisman, 2019
Xanthonia oblonga Takizawa & Basu, 1987
Xanthonia parva Riley & Quinn, 2019
Xanthonia picturata Weisman & Riley, 2019
Xanthonia pilosa Staines & Weisman, 2002
Xanthonia pinicola Schaeffer, 1933
Xanthonia placida Baly, 1874
Xanthonia querci Weisman, 2019
Xanthonia serrata Staines & Weisman, 2001
Xanthonia signata Chen, 1935
Xanthonia similis Tan, 1992
Xanthonia sinica Chen, 1935
Xanthonia stevensi Baly, 1863
Xanthonia striata Staines & Weisman, 2001
Xanthonia striatipennis Kimoto, 1969
Xanthonia taiwana Chûjô, 1956
Xanthonia texana Weisman, 2019
Xanthonia tuberosa Jacoby, 1882
Xanthonia umbilicata Bechyné, 1955
Xanthonia vagans (LeConte, 1884)
Xanthonia varipennis Chen, 1940
Xanthonia villosula (F. E. Melsheimer, 1847)

References

Xanthonia at Encyclopedia of Life

Eumolpinae
Chrysomelidae genera
Beetles of North America
Beetles of Asia
Beetles described in 1863
Taxa named by Joseph Sugar Baly